Gedung Meneng is a district located in the Tulang Bawang Regency of Lampung in Sumatra, Indonesia.

References

Populated places in Sumatra